Mohammad Yasin may refer to:

 Mohammad Yasin (cricketer) (born 1992), Pakistani cricketer
 Mohammad Yasin (politician) (born 1971), British MP for Bedford since 2017
 Mohammad Yasin (weightlifter), Indonesian weightlifter
 Mo Yasin, Pakistani squash player active in the 1970s